Franco Donegà (born 13 September 1952) is an Italian gymnast. He competed in eight events at the 1972 Summer Olympics.

References

1952 births
Living people
Italian male artistic gymnasts
Olympic gymnasts of Italy
Gymnasts at the 1972 Summer Olympics
Sportspeople from Genoa
20th-century Italian people